The Taunton Tigers are a charity-funded basketball team competing in the English Basketball League (EBL) Division 3 South League. The team is based in Taunton, Somerset and play all their home games at Wellsprings Leisure Centre, which has a capacity of 500 seats. Formerly a Division One side, the Tigers were forced to drop down the divisions after going into debt. They are currently coached by former player Matt Nolan.

History
The Taunton Tigers compete in the English Basketball League. They won back to back promotions in 2005–06 and 2006–07 to propel them from Division Three, to the top division of the EBL, Division One. The club finished eighth in the league in their maiden season, avoiding relegation. The following season brought disappointment, just two wins were recorded in the league, and they finished bottom, missing out on the post-season. Despite this, they remained in the top division for the following season which was expanded to twelve teams. The team won twelve league matches and seventeen overall, and enjoyed their greatest success in Division One. At the club's annual general meeting, it was revealed that the club was heavily in debt. The club's committee resigned, and combined with a number of key players announcing their retirement, the club were forced to withdraw from Division One. England Basketball would not let the club drop to Division Two, and instead the club had to move to Division Four. 

The team won their first season in Division Four, recording seven wins in the league and thirteen overall, and are competing in Division Three South in the 2011–12 season.

References

External links
Official Taunton Tigers website

Basketball teams in England
Sport in Taunton